Marjan Jonkman is a Dutch fashion model. As of February 2018, models.com ranks her as one of the Top 50 models in the world.

Career
Jonkman was scouted on Facebook. She started her career as a Saint Laurent exclusive; she modeled in campaigns for Topshop, Adidas, Marc Jacobs, Lanvin, Sephora, and Dsquared2, among others.

She walked in 60 shows during the A/W 2016 fashion week, including Chanel, Gucci, Dior, Versace, Alexander Wang, Kenzo, Moschino, Fendi, J.W. Anderson and Paul Smith.

Personal life
Jonkman formerly lived in New York City and currently lives in Amsterdam.

References 

1994 births
Living people
People from De Fryske Marren
Dutch female models
Women Management models